Ntare School is a residential all-boys' secondary school located in Mbarara, Mbarara District, south western Uganda. It was founded in 1956 by a Scottish educator named William Crichton.

Location
The coordinates of the school are 0°36'10.0"S, 30°39'11.0"E (Latitude:-0.602778; Longitude:30.653056).

Reputation
Ntare School is one of the most prestigious schools in Uganda due to its history, reputation, excellent academic performance, and dominance in sports.

Ntare School also boasts of an Alumni Soccer League the Ntare Lions League  which runs every sunday.

Academics

Subjects offered at Ordinary ("O") Level include; Biology, Chemistry, Christian Religious Education, Agriculture, Commerce, Computer Studies, English Language and Literature, Music, Fine Art, French, Geography, History, Mathematics, Physics, Political Education and Kiswahili.

At Advanced ("A") Level subjects offered are categorised into Arts and Sciences. The Arts subjects offered are; History, Economics, Divinity, French, Literature in English, Geography, Kiswahili, Music and Fine Art. The Science subjects offered are Physics, Chemistry, Mathematics, Biology, Agriculture,  Subsidiary Mathematics and General Paper which is a compulsory subject.

Houses of residence

Former Headmasters 
Mr. William Crichton - Founding Headmaster 1956 to 1971

Mr. Brian Remmer - 1971 to 1977

Mr. Jed Bangizi - 1977 to 1982

Mr. Gumisiriza G.L. - 1983 to 1985

Mr. H.H Mehangye - 1985 to 1987

Mr. Francis Kairagi - 1987 to 1990

Mr. Eric Kansiime - 1990 - 1991

Mr. Stephen Kamuhanda - 1991 to 2002

Mr. Humphrey Ahimbisibwe - 2003 to 2012

Mr. Turyagyenda Jimmy - 2013 up-to-date

Prominent alumni

Politicians
Yoweri Museveni 
Paul Kagame 
Amama Mbabazi
John Nasasira
Eriya Kategaya
Nobel Mayombo
Ephraim Kamuntu
Elioda Tumwesigye
Tarsis Kabwegyere
Daniel Kidega
Fred Ruhindi
Omwony Ojwok
Serapio Rukundo
James Nsaba Buturo
Richard Nduhura
Stephen Mallinga
Patrick Mazimhaka

Civil Servants
Vincent Opio-Lukone, Deputy Head of Public Service 2015-2016, Permanent Secretary/Deputy Secretary to Cabinet 2000-2016
Edson Atuhaire

Academics
 Elly Katunguka
Livingstone Lubobi
Atuhaire Winston Tumps, Professor at Makerere University

Judges
Amos Twinomujuni
Jotham Tumwesigye

Lawyers
Francis K. Butagira

Writers
Tumusiime Rushedge
Arthur Gakwandi
John Ruganda

Others
Allan Toniks
Dr Harmandar Singh Gupta Prominent Indian origin medical doctor, moved to Zaire in 1972 and finally settled in Bristol in 1984.
 Byonanebye Dathan Mirembe- Medical doctor
 Emmanuel Mugarura- Information Technologist
 Onesmus Kamacooko- 
Statistician
Tumusiime Marvin- Volleyball
Dr. Godfrey Tumwesigye, Academic, Lecturer at Makerere University Business School
Bemanya Twebaze, Lawyer; former Registrar General Uganda Registration Services Bureau; Director General at Africa Regional Intellectual Property Organisation (ARIPO)
Matsiko Mutungwire, University Secretary Busitema University

References

External links
Schoolnet Uganda Listing
"16 Students Arrested As Ntare And Mbarara High Renew Rivalry"

Boarding schools in Uganda
Boys' schools in Uganda
Educational institutions established in 1956
1956 establishments in Uganda
Mbarara District